This is a list of gliders/sailplanes of the world, (this reference lists all gliders with references, where available) 
Note: Any aircraft can glide for a short time, but gliders are designed to glide for longer.

Japanese miscellaneous constructors 
 Cumulus 5 – Japan
 Gannet G-4 Olympos
 Hikari 2.2
 Honjo K-16 Kamo – Honjo, Kiro
 Honjo-Miyahara Mita 2 – Honjo, Kiro & Miyahara, Asahi
 Itoh C-6 – Yamasaki Yoshio
 Keihikoki SS-2 – (軽飛行機式　SS-2型上級単座滑空機)
 Kimura HK-1 – Dr. Hidemasa Kimura
 Komadori Primary
 Kyushu 11 – SATO, Hiroshi & Osamu Hiroshi & Naka Maruta – Kyushu University
 Kirigamine K14 
 Kirigamine Mita 3 – Kirigamine Glider Manufacturing Co
 L.A.D. Mita 3 Kai 1 – Light Aircraft Development Co.
 L.A.D. SS-2 – Light Aircraft Development Co.
 Muramaya Asahi 1
 Nihon N-70 Cygnus – Nihon University
 Nippi B4
 Nippi NP-100A Albatross – (Nihon Hikoki Kabushiki Kaisha – Japan Aeroplane Manufacturing Co. Ltd.)
 Nippon Tombo
 Onishi OS-G3
 Yokosuka MXY5 Kugisho
 Yokosuka MXY8 (glider version of Mitsubishi J8M)
 Yokosuka Shinryu
 Nihon N-70 Cygnus – 日大式　N-70型「シグナス」動力滑空機 – Nihon University
 Shindo Cirrus 2
 SM-206
 Tainan Mita 3 – Tainan Industry Co.
 Takatori SH-1
 Takatori SH-15
 Takatori SH-18
 Teruhiko Eagle – Teruhiko Ukai (霧ケ峰式鷹型)
 Tsuno Amphibie – Tsuno Takishiro – Kyushu University (天風 水陸両用)

Notes

Further reading

External links

Lists of glider aircraft